The General Rafael Urdaneta Bridge is located at the Tablazo Strait outlet of Lake Maracaibo, in western Venezuela. The bridge connects Maracaibo with much of the rest of the country. It is named after General Rafael Urdaneta, a Venezuelan hero of Independence who was born in Maracaibo.

Design and construction 

Made of reinforced and prestressed concrete, the cable-stayed bridge spans  from shore to shore. The bridge carries only vehicles.

The competition to design the bridge started in 1957 and was won by Riccardo Morandi, an Italian civil engineer. Morandi's was the only concrete design out of twelve entries, and was expected to be less expensive to maintain, as well as providing valuable experience of prestressed concrete technology for Venezuela. Construction was carried out by several companies, including Grün & Bilfinger, Julius Berger, Bauboag AG, Philipp Holzmann AG, Precomprimido C.A., Wayss & Freytag and K Ingeniería.

According to eminent bridge engineer Michel Virlogeux:

the Lake Maracaibo Bridge deserves to be part of the series of the most famous bridges over the world, with the Golden Gate Bridge, the bridge over the Firth of Forth, the Brooklyn Bridge, and the Garabit Viaduct.

History 
It was opened on 24 August 1962 by the then-president of Venezuela Romulo Betancourt.

In April 1964, parts of the bridge collapsed after a collision with the tanker Esso Maracaibo, causing the deaths of seven people.

The construction of a second cable-stayed bridge has been proposed since 1982, with a series of studies made since 2000. The cost of the new bridge has been estimated at US$440m, to be largely privately financed via tolls.

The bridge's structural integrity received heightened concern after the August 2018 collapse of a stayed pier on a similar bridge, Ponte Morandi in Genoa, Italy.

See also 
 List of bridges by length

References 
 Dupré, Judith: "Bridges", Könemann, 1998, 
 Virlogeux, Michel: "Bridges with Multiple Cable Stayed Spans", Structural Engineering International, 1/2001

Notes

External links 
 General Rafael Urdaneta Website in spanish
 
 Info on Maracaibo including the bridge
 Esso Maracaibo website
 https://www.venezuelatuya.com/occidente/puenterafaelurdanetaeng.htm

Lake Maracaibo
Bridges completed in 1962
Cable-stayed bridges in Venezuela
Buildings and structures in Maracaibo
Road bridges
Concrete bridges